Ghelința is a commune in Covasna County, Transylvania, Romania. It is composed of two villages, Ghelința and Harale (Haraly).

It formed part of the Székely Land, ethno-cultural region of the historical Transylvania province.

Demographics
The commune has an absolute Székely Hungarian majority. According to the 2002 census, it has a population of 4,774 of which 98.49% or 4,702 are Székely Hungarian.

Tourist attraction
The St. Emeric Catholic Church with its 13th century murals is the main tourist attraction of the village.

See also
Laslea, Mălâncrav church: early 14th- and 15th-century murals
Church on the Hill (Sighișoara), 14th-16th century murals
Dârjiu, church murals from 1419

References

Communes in Covasna County
Localities in Transylvania